The Lego Batman Movie is a 2017 computer-animated superhero comedy film produced by Warner Animation Group, DC Entertainment, RatPac Entertainment, Lego System A/S, Lin Pictures, Lord Miller Productions, and Vertigo Entertainment, and distributed by Warner Bros. Pictures. It was directed by Chris McKay (in his feature directorial debut) from a screenplay by Seth Grahame-Smith, Chris McKenna, Erik Sommers, Jared Stern, and John Whittington. Based on the characters from the DC Universe created by DC Comics and the Lego DC Super Heroes' Batman toy line, the film is a collaboration between production houses from the United States, Australia, and Denmark, the first spin-off in The Lego Movie franchise and the second installment overall. The film features Will Arnett reprising his role as Batman from The Lego Movie alongside Zach Galifianakis, Michael Cera, Rosario Dawson, and Ralph Fiennes. The story follows the title character (Arnett) as he attempts to overcome his greatest fear to stop the Joker's (Galifianakis) latest plan.

Development of The Lego Batman Movie started in October 2014, after Warner Bros. announced several Lego films, following the critical and commercial success of The Lego Movie, while Chris McKay was hired to direct the film after being replaced by Rob Schrab to direct the sequel to The Lego Movie. He cited both The Naked Gun and Airplane! film series as his main inspirations. Casting call began in July to November 2015. The film pays homage to previous Batman films, cartoons, and comics. The film also features characters from other notable franchises and film series with them. Like The Lego Movie, the animation was provided by Animal Logic. Lorne Balfe composed the film's musical score.

The Lego Batman Movie had its world premiere in Dublin, Ireland on January 29, 2017, and was released in the United States on February 10, 2017 in RealD 3D, Dolby Cinema, IMAX, IMAX 3D and 4DX formats. The film received generally positive reviews from critics for its animation, voice acting, soundtrack, visual style, and humor, and was also commercially successful, having grossed $310 million worldwide against a budget of around $80 million. A sequel, Lego Superfriends, was announced in 2018, but was cancelled after Universal Pictures acquired the Lego franchise rights.

Plot

Within the DC superhero dimension of the Lego multiverse, Batman protects Gotham City and fights crime. During his latest mission to stop the Joker and other Gotham supervillains from destroying the city, Batman succeeds, but also hurts Joker's feelings by telling him he is not as important in his life as he thinks he is, leading Joker to seek the ultimate revenge on him.

The following day, Batman's alter ego Bruce Wayne attends the city's winter gala, which is celebrating both the retirement of Police Commissioner Gordon and the ascension of his daughter Barbara to replace him. Wayne is smitten by Barbara, and this distraction results in him unwittingly agreeing to adopt the enthusiastic orphan Dick Grayson. Wayne is then infuriated by Barbara's plans to restructure the police to function without the need of Batman. Joker crashes the party with other Gotham supervillains. Joker surrenders himself to police, while capturing almost all the other Gotham supervillains for police, except Harley Quinn. With so many supervillains incarcerated, Batman becomes desolate as Gotham no longer requires his crime-fighting skills.

Suspecting that Joker is up to no good, Batman plans to steal Superman's Phantom Zone projector, a device that can banish anyone to the Phantom Zone, which houses some of the most dangerous villains in the Lego multiverse, only for Alfred to intervene and advise him to take care of Dick. Batman initially refuses, so Alfred allows Dick to enter the Batcave. Appearing as Batman before Dick, Batman states that he is also adopting Dick, and fosters Dick as Robin to help in his scheme. Batman and Robin recover the projector from the Fortress of Solitude, break into Arkham Asylum and successfully send the Joker to the Phantom Zone. Suspecting that Joker wanted to be sent there, Barbara locks up Batman and Robin.

While the projector is being seized as evidence, Harley steals it back as part of Joker's plan, and frees him, allowing him to return to Gotham with all the multiverse's villains he had recruited in the Phantom Zone, including Sauron, who informs the Joker that Batman is Bruce Wayne. The multiverse's villains attack Gotham and take over Wayne Island. Realizing that Gotham does need Batman after all, Barbara releases Batman and Robin and teams up with them and Alfred to stop the new threat. Although his teammates achieve some success in fighting the multiverse's villains, Batman forcibly sends them away and confronts Joker alone, fearing that he might lose them just like his parents.

Believing how Batman is incapable of changing his ways, Joker sends him to the Phantom Zone before stealing the Batcave's stash of confiscated bombs to destroy Gotham. Meanwhile, Phyllis, the Phantom Zone's gatekeeper, shows Batman how he has mistreated Dick, Alfred, Barbara and Joker. Batman accepts his greatest fear, being part of a family, and decides to change. Batman's teammates return to the fight to help him, but are endangered themselves. Batman makes a deal with Phyllis to temporarily return to Gotham to retrieve the Zone's escaped prisoners, and arrives in time to save his teammates, apologizing to them for leaving them and requesting their help to stop Joker. They agree, with Barbara taking on the Batgirl persona.

With help from Gotham's other supervillains, who felt neglected by the Joker when he refused to break them out of Arkham, Batman and his team defeat the escaped multiverse's villains and send them back to the Phantom Zone. However, the Joker's bombs explode, tearing Gotham apart at the plates below the city. Batman convinces Joker to help him by telling him he gives him purpose to be the hero he is, and with the help of every civilian and villain, they manage to save Gotham, chain-linking themselves together to reassemble the plates.

In the aftermath, Batman reveals to Dick that he is Bruce Wayne, then goes to return to the Phantom Zone to face the consequences of his earlier behavior. Phyllis prevents Batman from entering the Phantom Zone, after realizing he is a hero and seeing how he changed to save everyone. Afterward, Batman gives Joker and Gotham's other supervillains a headstart to avoid capture, knowing they will be no match for the new Bat-family.

Voice cast

 Will Arnett as Bruce Wayne / Batman: A billionaire by day and superhero by night, who defends Gotham City from crime. Arnett also voiced the character in The Lego Movie and later reprised his role in its sequel.
 Zach Galifianakis as Joker: A clown-themed villain in Gotham City and Batman's archenemy, who defines himself by his conflict with him.
 Michael Cera as Dick Grayson / Robin: An orphan who is adopted by Bruce Wayne, and becomes a sidekick to Batman.
 Rosario Dawson as Barbara Gordon / Batgirl: The newly elected police commissioner of Gotham, who hopes to restructure the Gotham City Police Department so that the city could defend itself without Batman. She eventually comes to trust Batman and becomes Batgirl.
 Ralph Fiennes as Alfred Pennyworth: The Wayne family's butler, and Bruce's father figure and only confidant. Fiennes later reprised his role in The Lego Movie 2.
 Jenny Slate as Harley Quinn, The Joker's girlfriend and accomplice.
 Héctor Elizondo as James Gordon, the retired police commissioner of Gotham and Barbara's father.
 Ellie Kemper as Phyllis, a brick who is the gatekeeper of the Phantom Zone.
Mariah Carey as Mayor McCaskill, the mayor of Gotham.
Lauren White as Chief O'Hara, the police chief of Gotham. 
Todd Hansen and Chris McKay respectively as Captain Dale and Pilot Bill, the two pilots of the airplane hijacked by the Joker at the beginning of the film.
Brent Musburger, Ralph Garman, and Chris Hardwick make cameo appearances as three unnamed reporters.
Mark Jonathan Davis as a fictionalized version of himself (his character Richard Cheese also appears through the use of archival recordings). Green Lantern by Jonah Hill (also reprising his role from The Lego Movie), and the Flash by Adam DeVine. 
Channing Tatum as Superman (reprising his role from The Lego Movie and its sequel)

Several actors voice the various villains from Batman's rogues gallery, including Billy Dee Williams as Two-Face (as a nod to his role as Harvey Dent, Two-Face's former identity, in the 1989 Batman film), Riki Lindhome as Poison Ivy, Conan O'Brien as Riddler, Jason Mantzoukas as the Scarecrow, Zoë Kravitz as Catwoman,  (Kravitz would later portray Catwoman in The Batman). Matt Villa as Killer Croc, Kate Micucci as Clayface, Doug Benson as Bane (the character's appearance and Benson's performance are meant to satirize Tom Hardy's portrayal of Bane in The Dark Knight Rises), John Venzon as Penguin, (the character's appearance is a nod to Danny DeVito‘s portrayal of Penguin in Batman Returns), David Burrows as Mr. Freeze (Burrows also voices an anchorman), and Laura Kightlinger as Orca (Kightlinger also voices a reporter). The film also features villains from other franchises, including Sauron's Eye of Sauron from The Lord of the Rings and The Hobbit (voiced by Jemaine Clement), the Wicked Witch of the West from The Wizard of Oz (also voiced by Riki Lindhome), Lord Voldemort from Harry Potter (voiced by Eddie Izzard), King Kong from King Kong, the Swamp Creature from various monster films (both voiced by Seth Green), Medusa from Greek mythology (also voiced by Lauren White), and the Daleks from Doctor Who (voiced by Nicholas Briggs, reprising his role from the television series).

The voice of the Batcomputer (credited as 'Puter), depicted here as an artificial intelligence controlling all of Batman's gadgets and vehicles, is done by Siri.

Archive footage of Tom Cruise and Renée Zellweger from Jerry Maguire is used.

Production

Development
In October 2014, following the success of The Lego Movie, Warner Bros. greenlit multiple Lego films, including The Lego Batman Movie, a spin-off starring Batman. Warner Bros. scheduled the release of The Lego Batman Movie for 2017, moving the release date for The Lego Movie 2 (later titled as The Lego Movie 2: The Second Part) to 2018. Chris McKay, who co-directed The Lego Movie, was brought on board to direct the film, making it his solo directorial debut. Will Arnett returned to voice Batman, with the story written by Seth Grahame-Smith, and the film produced by Dan Lin, Roy Lee, Phil Lord and Christopher Miller. On April 20, 2015, Warner Bros. scheduled The Lego Batman Movie for a February 10, 2017 release. The film itself also serves as the first theatrically released animated feature to be based on a licensed property, which explains the lack of yellow Lego figures, despite Emmet Brickowski, the main character of the Lego Movie, making a small cameo.

In an interview about his work on the film, McKay stated that working on the film was "a very mixed blessing" owing partly to the film's hectic time schedule for its production, remarking that the two-and-a-half years allocated to the film made it difficult to fit in everything that he wanted for the movie, considering his earlier work on The Lego Movie. His work on The Lego Batman Movie was influenced by the comedy portrayed in both The Naked Gun and Airplane! film series, with his pitch for the film to the studios being described as like "Jerry Maguire as directed by Michael Mann". His proposal to combine all the Batman eras featured in the comic book series and various media formats, including movies and comic series, despite a couple of issues—the total inconsistency inherent to such a task, and Lego rejecting some of the characters he proposed to include in the film—was based on his desire of how to portray Robin within the film's setting. In an interview regarding his version of the superhero duo, McKay stated:

In 2019, prior to the release of The Lego Movie 2: The Second Part, Chris Miller stated that all of the Lego movies are based on the imagination of a child character, with The Lego Movie events happening in young Finn's mind. Miller affirmed that The Lego Batman Movie was also from the imagination of Finn and Bianca, though the characters did not appear within the film, although Bianca was alluded to as Phyllis' boss.

Casting
In July 2015, Arnett's Arrested Development co-star Michael Cera was cast to voice Robin. In August 2015, Zach Galifianakis entered final negotiations to voice the Joker. In October 2015, Rosario Dawson was cast to voice Barbara Gordon, the daughter of police commissioner James Gordon who later becomes the crime-fighting heroine Batgirl. The following month, Ralph Fiennes was cast as Alfred Pennyworth, Bruce Wayne's butler. Initial reports indicated that Mariah Carey was playing Commissioner Gordon. However, she was actually cast as Mayor McCaskill.

Batman and pop culture references
As part of its production, the film was designed to make numerous references to previous Batman films, cartoons and comics. In two distinct scenes where Barbara Gordon depicts Batman's long history of services for the police and Alfred quotes Batman's previous films (as previous moments of emotional crisis), they mention: the 1940s Batman serials (erroneously placed earlier than his comic books appearances); the films Batman (1966), Batman (1989), Batman Returns (1992), Batman Forever (1995), Batman & Robin (1997), Batman Begins (2005), The Dark Knight (2008), The Dark Knight Rises (2012), Batman v Superman: Dawn of Justice (2016) and Suicide Squad (2016); the television shows Batman (1960s), Batman: The Animated Series (1990s), Batman Beyond (2000s) and The Batman (2000s); and the comics Detective Comics #27 (Batman's introductory story), The Dark Knight Returns (1986) and Gotham by Gaslight (1989). Other references include previous costumes worn by Batman and Robin and the various Batmobiles used. In most cases, their appearances in the film are done in a Lego style, with the exception being footage from a live-action shot of Adam West's depiction of Batman in the 1960s Batman series and a picture of Batman's suit from Batman and Robin. Climactic events from past Batman films involving the Joker have been mentioned, including "that time with the parade and the Prince music" (1989's Batman) and "the two boats" (The Dark Knight).

Alongside Joker, the main antagonist of the film's story, and Superman, who features heavily and has notable links to the Christopher Reeve films Superman (1978) and its sequel Superman II (1980), many other DC characters, both villains associated with Batman and other DC superheroes, feature in the film. The film's villains who have been featured in Batman comics, films and cartoons include: Man-Bat; Captain Boomerang; Egghead; Crazy Quilt; Eraser; Polka-Dot Man; Mime; Tarantula; King Tut from the 1960s series; Killer Moth; March Harriet; Zodiac Master; the Mutant Leader from The Dark Knight Returns; Doctor Phosphorus; Magpie; Calculator; Hugo Strange; an unidentified version of Red Hood; the Kabuki Twins from The Batman; Orca; Gentleman Ghost; Clock King; Calendar Man; Kite Man; Catman; Zebra-Man; and a variation of Condiment King from Batman: The Animated Series. The other DC heroes who feature, both from the Justice League and Super Friends, include: Wonder Woman; Aquaman; The Flash; Cyborg; Green Arrow; Black Canary; Hawkman; Hawkgirl; Martian Manhunter; Apache Chief; Black Vulcan; El Dorado; Samurai; Wonder Dog; the Wonder Twins and Gleek. Although not part of the DC franchise, Iron Man from Marvel Comics is referenced in the film as part of a small joke about Batman's password for entering the Batcave, referencing the famous rivalry between DC and Marvel.

The film also features characters from other notable franchises and film series with them following the same narrative of The Lego Movie in that they came from worlds that co-exist alongside others of the Lego Universe, which are made up of Lego playsets of the various media franchises. These additional characters include: Medusa from Lego Minifigures; the Swamp Creature, Evil Mummy, and Lord Vampyre from Lego Monster Fighters; King Kong; the Daleks from Doctor Who; the Wicked Witch of the West and her flying monkeys from The Wizard of Oz; the Kraken from Clash of the Titans; Agent Smith and his clones from The Matrix; the great white shark from Jaws; Voldemort from Harry Potter; Sauron from The Lord of the Rings and The Hobbit; the Tyrannosaurus and Velociraptors from Jurassic Park; The Skeleton Warriors from Jason and the Argonauts and the Gremlins. The way in which the Gremlins attack a plane references The Twilight Zone episode "Nightmare at 20,000 Feet".

The film also includes Batman watching the scene from Jerry Maguire where Tom Cruise says "You complete me" (which makes Batman laugh out loud); this line had previously been quoted by The Joker in The Dark Knight. In the scene where Batman discusses possible team names he mentions Fox Force Five, which is the name of Mia Wallace's failed television pilot mentioned in Pulp Fiction. The film's use of Cutting Crew's "(I Just) Died in Your Arms" is a nod to the romantic comedy Never Been Kissed. The film's other references include Gleaming the Cube and Gymkata.

The casting of Billy Dee Williams as Two-Face references the 1989 Batman film, in which Williams played District Attorney Harvey Dent, before his transition to Two-Face. Director Chris McKay said the film's depiction of Gotham City was inspired by Chicago partly due to  Christopher Nolan having filmed The Dark Knight Trilogy in Chicago.

A scene from The Lego Movie is reused in the film, depicting Emmet falling down from Lord Business's tower into the real world, as television journalists explain what would happen if Joker detonates his bomb.

Music

The Lego Batman Movie is the first in the franchise not to be composed by Mark Mothersbaugh; the film score is composed by Lorne Balfe. The soundtrack album was released by WaterTower Music on February 3, 2017, through two-disc CD and for digital download, while the vinyl version was released on May 19, 2017.

Marketing

The first teaser trailer for The Lego Batman Movie was released on March 24, 2016, and features the song "Black and Yellow" by Wiz Khalifa. It was attached to showings of Batman v Superman: Dawn of Justice in theatres. A second teaser trailer was released on March 28, 2016, and features references to all live-action iterations of Batman, from the 1960s Batman TV series to Batman v Superman. A third trailer was released on July 23, 2016. A fourth trailer was released on November 4, 2016. Over twenty Lego sets inspired by scenes from the film were released for the film including two sets of Collectible Minifigures. A Story Pack for the toys-to-life video game Lego Dimensions based on The Lego Batman Movie was released on February 10, 2017, alongside the film. The pack adds a six-level story campaign adapting the events of the film, and includes playable figures of Robin and Batgirl, a driveable Batwing, and a constructible gateway model based on the Batcomputer. A Fun Pack including Excalibur Batman and his Bionic Steed was also released the same day.

On January 14, 2017, at the North American International Auto Show in Detroit, Chevrolet unveiled a life-sized Lego Batmobile inspired by the design featured in the film, constructed from around 350,000 Lego pieces. As a related promotion, a Bat-Signal (alternating between Batman's emblem and the Chevrolet logo) was projected on the Renaissance Center over the weekend, and Chevrolet released a new television commercial tying into the film, featuring the Batmobile as a crossover with its ongoing "Real People, Not Actors" campaign.

Warner Bros. released several promotional tie-ins on the week of the movie's release. LEGO billboard versions of several TV shows were shown outside of the studio lot, that took 300 hours to make out of 10,000 bricks. The Big Bang Theory included a LEGO version of the opening sequence in the episode "The Locomotion Reverberation" that first aired on CBS. In addition, the network aired two LEGO commercials featuring Batman and the cast.

The CW featured LEGO end cards for Supergirl, The Flash, Legends of Tomorrow, and Arrow, respectively, on the week of the movie's release. All four DC shows also include a special variant of the Berlanti Productions logo that featured Batman's cameo and a new recording from Greg Berlanti's real-life father who says "Batman, move your head." instead of the usual "Greg, move your head." In addition, the network aired two commercials where Batman interacts with the characters from each show.

Release

Theatrical
The film's world premiere was conducted in Dublin, Ireland on January 29, 2017, where upon it went into general release from February 8; it was released in Denmark on February 9, and in the United States and the United Kingdom on February 10. Its overall release saw movie theatres displaying the film in 3D, RealD 3D, Dolby Cinema, IMAX 3D and 4DX. though the latter format was restricted to 3D for North America, while international countries were able to view it in IMAX.

The Lego Batman Movie is notably the first animated movie based on Batman to receive a full theatrical release since Batman: Mask of the Phantasm (1993).

Home media
The LEGO Batman Movie was released on Digital HD on May 19, 2017. The release included the theatrical short film The Master: A LEGO Ninjago Short, as well as four new short films: Dark Hoser, Batman is Just Not That Into You, Cooking with Alfred and Movie Sound Effects: How Do They Do That?. The LEGO Batman Movie was released on DVD, Blu-ray (2D and 3D), and Ultra HD Blu-ray by Warner Bros. Home Entertainment on June 13, 2017. The film debuted at No. 3 on the NPD VideoScan overall disc sales chart.

Reception

Box office
The Lego Batman Movie grossed $175.8 million in the United States and Canada and $136.2 million in other territories for a worldwide gross of $312 million, against a production budget of $80 million.

In the United States and Canada, The Lego Batman Movie opened alongside two other sequels, Fifty Shades Darker and John Wick: Chapter 2, and was projected to gross around $60 million from 4,088 theaters in its opening weekend. It earned $2.2 million from Thursday-night previews and $14.5 million on Friday. It went on to open with $53 million, finishing first at the box office. In its second weekend, the film grossed $32.7 million (a small drop of 38.4%), again topping the box office; with the additional President's Day holiday on Monday, it made a total of $42.7 million for the weekend. In its third weekend of release, the film dropped to second at the box office, behind newcomer Get Out, grossing $19.2 million (a drop of 41.2%).

Outside North America the film was simultaneously released in 61 countries, and was expected to gross around $40 million over its first three days. It ended up grossing $37 million in its opening weekend, including $9.3 million in the United Kingdom, $2.6 million in Mexico, $2.3 million in Germany and $2.2 million in Russia.

Critical response
The website's critical consensus reads, "The Lego Batman Movie continues its block-buster franchise's winning streak with another round of dizzyingly funny—and beautifully animated—family-friendly mayhem." It was ranked the 23rd best superhero movie of all time on the site. On Metacritic, the film has a score of 75 out of 100, based on 48 critics, indicating "generally favorable reviews". Audiences polled by CinemaScore gave the film an average grade of "A−" on an A+ to F scale.

Mike Ryan of Uproxx gave the film a positive review, praising its comedy, and saying: "The LEGO Batman Movie isn't the same experience as watching The LEGO Movie, but I also don't think it's trying to be. It's trying to be a fun superhero movie with clever callbacks to previous Batman films (every single Batman movie all the way back to the 1940s serials are referenced) that can, at least, provide DC superhero fans with a taste of fun amidst all the doom and gloom. (That can either be a reference to 'the real world' or the current DC Cinematic Universe films, you can choose either one you want or both.) And at that, The LEGO Batman Movie succeeds." Chris Nashawaty of Entertainment Weekly gave the film a "B+" and wrote, "LEGO Batman revs so fast and moves so frenetically that it becomes a little exhausting by the end. It flirts with being too much of a good thing. But rarely has corporate brainwashing been so much fun and gone down with such a delightful aftertaste." Justin Chang of the Los Angeles Times was positive in his review, saying, "In its best moments, this gag-a-minute Bat-roast serves as a reminder that, in the right hands, a sharp comic scalpel can be an instrument of revelation as well as ridicule." Michael O'Sullivan of The Washington Post praised the film for its heart, humor, and action which "snap together, with a satisfying click."

Accolades

Other media

Sets

Video games
Lego Dimensions includes characters from various franchises, including The Lego Movie and The Lego Batman Movie. The game's Starter Pack includes Wyldstyle, while Emmet, Benny, Bad Cop, and Unikitty are included in Fun Packs. From The Lego Batman Movie, Robin and Batgirl are included in a Story Pack while Excalibur Batman is included in a Fun Pack. However, Robin gets his voice actor changed in the game to Robbie Daymond and can also use his appearance from Teen Titans Go! if he is used in the Teen Titans Go! World.

Based on The Lego Batman Movie, Warner Bros. Interactive Entertainment released the endless-runner game coinciding with the release of the film. It was released for Android and iOS.

Cancelled sequel
On December 5, 2018, McKay announced a sequel to the film was in the works, with him returning to direct. The film was set for release in 2022. However, while the rights of DC Comics are owned by Warner Bros, Universal Pictures acquired the film rights to The Lego Movie franchise in 2020, effectively cancelling the sequel.

In June 2021, McKay revealed that the script was being written by Michael Waldron and Dan Harmon. It would have focused on Batman's relationship with the Justice League, particularly Superman, and the main villains would have been Lex Luthor and OMAC. Waldron revealed that the film was tentatively titled Lego Superfriends.

References

External links

 
 Official website at Lego.com 
 

2017 films
2010s English-language films
2010s American animated films
2017 action comedy films
2010s animated superhero films
2017 3D films
2017 computer-animated films
American 3D films
American action comedy films
American children's animated adventure films
American children's animated comedy films
American children's animated fantasy films
American children's animated superhero films
American computer-animated films
American fantasy adventure films
Danish animated films
Lego Batman films
Animated crossover films
2010s superhero comedy films
IMAX films
Film spin-offs
Films about adoption
Films about orphans
Films about witchcraft
Films about wizards
Films produced by Dan Lin
Films produced by Roy Lee
Films produced by Phil Lord and Christopher Miller
Films set on fictional islands
Batman
Metafictional works
Films with screenplays by Chris McKenna
Films with screenplays by Erik Sommers
Films with screenplays by Jared Stern
Films with screenplays by John Whittington (screenwriter)
Films scored by Lorne Balfe
Films about sentient toys
Self-reflexive films
Animal Logic films
Dune Entertainment films
Warner Bros. Animation animated films
Warner Bros. animated films
Warner Bros. films
3D animated films
2017 directorial debut films
2017 comedy films
Films about toys
Vertigo Entertainment films
Warner Animation Group films
4DX films
Films directed by Chris McKay